Dorakada Marawa (Death at the Doorstep) is a 1998 Sri Lankan Sinhala drama film directed by Vasantha Obeysekera and produced by Sarath Abeysena for Abeysena Salaroo. It stars Sanath Gunathilake and Sangeetha Weeraratne in lead roles along with Veena Jayakody and Sathischandra Edirisinghe. Music composed by Rohana Weerasinghe. It is the 904th Sri Lankan film in the Sinhala cinema.

Plot
The film revolves about the death of a newly-wed couple in a car crash.

Cast
 Sanath Gunathilake as Priyantha
 Sangeetha Weeraratne as Subhashini
 Veena Jayakody as Priyantha's mother
 Sathischandra Edirisinghe as Subha's father
 D.B Surendra
 Ramani Fonseka
 Malkanthi Jayasinghe
 Rex Kodippili
 Geetha Kanthi Jayakody as Subhashini's sister
 Roger Seneviratne as Priyantha's friend
 Buddhadasa Vithanarachchi as Coroner
 Bandula Vithanage
 Sarath Namalgama

References

External links
Sri Lanka Cinema Database

1998 films
1990s Sinhala-language films
Films set in Sri Lanka (1948–present)
1998 drama films
Sri Lankan drama films